Mürseller can refer to:

 Mürseller, Karamanlı
 Mürseller, Osmangazi